Kim Do-hoon may refer to:
 Kim Do-hoon, (born 1970), South Korean footballer
 Kim Do-hoon (golfer, born March 1989), South Korean golfer
 Kim Do-hoon (golfer, born April 1989), South Korean golfer